James Eli Webb (21 September 1887 – 14 February 1939) was an Australian politician.

Webb represented the seat of Hurstville in the New South Wales Legislative Assembly from 1932 to 1939 for the United Australia Party. He attended Sydney Boys High School.

Notes

People educated at Sydney Boys High School
Sydney Medical School alumni
Members of the New South Wales Legislative Assembly
United Australia Party members of the Parliament of New South Wales
Mayors of Hurstville
Australian Army officers
Australian military doctors
Australian military personnel of World War I
1887 births
1939 deaths
20th-century Australian politicians
20th-century Australian medical doctors
Burials at Gore Hill Cemetery